The State Library of Oregon in Salem, is the library for the U.S. state of Oregon.  The mission of the State Library of Oregon is to provide leadership and resources to continue growing vibrant library services for Oregonians with print disabilities, the Legislature and state government, and all Oregonians through local libraries.

History
The Territorial Library was first housed in the Territorial Capitol Building that burned in 1855 with most of the library collection lost to the fire.

The Oregon State Library was established as the Oregon Library Commission in 1905.  The original mission of the Library was to establish public and school libraries throughout Oregon. Cornelia Marvin came to Oregon from the Wisconsin Free Library Commission to direct the commission, and later became the first State Librarian. Soon the State Library was also providing information to state government agencies and collecting and preserving the publications of state agencies.

Prior to the completion of a stand-alone building in 1939, the state library was located in the basement and first floor of the Oregon Supreme Court Building. This building and the Oregon State Capitol were connected by tunnels used for heating and electricity. The fire that destroyed the capitol in 1935 also caused damage to the library collections, when the water used to fight the fire drained into the basement.

In 1969 the Library took over Talking Book and Braille library services for blind and print-disabled Oregonians from the Multnomah County Library in Portland.

Operations

Today the State Library provides information services to over 37,000 state government employees, circulates library materials in audio and Braille format to over 5,000 blind and print-disabled Oregonians, and provides grants and assistance to help develop and improve local library services and to foster greater cooperation among all of Oregon's libraries. The library is also a regional depository for the Federal Depository Library Program.

Since its founding, the State Library has been governed by an independent board. The present State Library Board consists of nine members from throughout the state who are appointed by the governor and confirmed by the senate to serve four-year terms.

Building
The historic State Library Building, located in downtown Salem, was dedicated in 1939. It was the first building to be constructed on what is today known as the Capitol Mall, and was completed only two years after the dedication of the Oregon State Capitol in 1937. The State Library Building was extensively renovated in the 1990s.  It was listed on the National Register of Historic Places in 2022.

See also

Mark O. Hatfield Library
Parish L. Willis

References

External links

Salem Online History: State Library
Oregon Geology: Library renovation
The Origins of the Oregon State Library

State Library of Oregon -- Contact Us

1905 establishments in Oregon
Buildings and structures in Salem, Oregon
Culture of Salem, Oregon
Federal depository libraries
Government agencies established in 1905
Libraries in Oregon
Library buildings completed in 1939
Library, Oregon State
State libraries of the United States
Works Progress Administration in Oregon
Libraries established in 1905
National Register of Historic Places in Marion County, Oregon